The Electoral district of Whittlesea was an electoral district of the Legislative Assembly in the Australian state of Victoria.

Members

Election results

References

Former electoral districts of Victoria (Australia)
1985 establishments in Australia
1992 disestablishments in Australia
Constituencies established in 1985
Constituencies disestablished in 1992